The Dianbao River is a river in Taiwan. It flows through Kaohsiung City for 32 km.

See also
List of rivers in Taiwan

References

Rivers of Taiwan
Landforms of Kaohsiung